The Northern Territory Heritage Register is a heritage register,  being a statutory list of places in the Northern Territory of Australia that are protected by the Northern Territory statute, the Heritage Act 2011. The register is maintained by the Northern Territory Heritage Council.

Other registers 
Sites within the Northern Territory are listed on national and international heritage registers such as the following, are not duplicated in the Northern Territory Heritage Register:
 UNESCO World Heritage list
 Australian National Heritage list
 Commonwealth Heritage list
 Australian National Shipwreck database

References

External links 
 (last amended 1 May 2016.)
  – Searchable database.

 
Heritage registers in Australia
History of the Northern Territory